Easter Everywhere is the second studio album by the American psychedelic rock band the 13th Floor Elevators. It was released on 25 October 1967, through record label International Artists. It is regarded by many critics to be one of the finest psychedelic albums ever released.

Background

Easter Everywhere was packaged with lyrics printed on the inner sleeve, gold ink on the cover (which flaked off), and full color pictures on the reverse. The packaging was quite expensive at the time of release.

Symbolism
The front cover, hand-drawn by George Banks, prominently features a primeval Eastern sun, intended to represent the open blazing third eye. Above this is the seventh chakra, the ultimate realm of Nirvana. The gold color on which this is printed was chosen as a symbolic color for the divine. Below the sun is the band's name, colored red and formatted to look like the eyebrows of Buddha. This image concept was selected by lyricist and jug player Tommy Hall, along with the rear cover image of a meditating yogi, which is from a photograph of an eighteenth-century painting hanging in the National Museum of Indian Art in New Delhi. Hall selected these images from a Tantric art book, intending to communicate that evolution is obtainable through alignment of the chakras and opening of the third eye (corresponding to the pineal gland); thus a soul coalesces with the collective primeval life force and retains a latent knowledge of its previous existence, therefore consciously achieving immortality.

Title
While the use of the term Easter in the album's title is often misconstrued as implying the album to be of primarily Christian merit, the album's composition melds the beliefs of multiple religions, combining Buddhist, Hindu, and Gnostic scriptures into a single unifying spiritual concept evaluated from a Western, Christian perspective. In the band's first and only interview, given to Houston fanzine Mother on November 20, 1967, Tommy Hall explained the correct interpretation of the title:

Release
The album features songs ranging from their own psychedelic "Slip Inside this House" to a psychedelic cover version of Bob Dylan's "It's All Over Now, Baby Blue". "Levitation," which was also released as a single, ranks among the band's well-known songs. As on the previous album, Tommy Hall's electric jug is prominent in the music. The album was met with lukewarm reviews upon initial release, with a review in Billboard Magazine writing "call it intellectual-rock or call it musical flights of fancy, except for tunes that sound almost like each other, this group is inventive over-all".

The original 1967 stereo mix of Easter Everywhere has never been officially reissued, despite claims by various record labels since its original issue. The master tapes are considered missing (or presumed destroyed). The International Artists label was revived by Lelan Rogers in the late 1970s, who reissued Easter Everywhere along with the label's entire LP catalog in 1979, debuting reprocessed stereo mixes with added phasing effects. The album was again reissued on vinyl in 1988 and for the first time on CD in 1991 by Charly Records UK under the Decal imprint, using similarly phased stereo mixes.

Following a lawsuit filed by the family of Roky Erickson against Lelan Rogers in 1993 for unpaid royalties, Charly Records purchased the licensing to the full International Artists catalog from Rogers in 1995, which included Easter Everywhere.  In 2009, the original mono version (sourced from vinyl) and the original stereo version were released as part of the Sign Of The 3-Eyed Men box set.  In 2010, Charly Records re-released the album in a limited edition CD set featuring "Fire In My Bones", originally released in 1985 on an outtakes album of the same name. The album was again released on vinyl in 2012 as part of the Music Of The Spheres box set, which Charly Records advertised as "mastered from the original tape source

Track listing

Personnel

 Roky Erickson – lead vocal, rhythm guitar, harmonica
 Tommy Hall – electric jug
 Stacy Sutherland – lead guitar, lead vocal 
 Dan Galindo – bass guitar
 Danny Thomas – drums
 John Ike Walton – drums 
 Ronnie Leatherman  – bass guitar 
 Clementine Hall  – backing vocals 

Technical
 Lelan Rogers – production
 Frank Davis – engineering
 Walt Andrus – engineering
 Guy Clark – sleeve photography
 Russell Wheelock – sleeve photography

References

Sources
Drummond, Paul (2009). Line notes to The 13th Floor Elevators - Easter Everywhere, Charly Records.

External links

 

The 13th Floor Elevators albums
International Artists albums
1967 albums
Radar Records albums
Charly Records albums